The 2005 DFB-Pokal Final decided the winner of the 2004–05 DFB-Pokal, the 62nd season of Germany's premier knockout football cup competition. It was played on 28 May 2005 at the Olympiastadion in Berlin. Bayern Munich won the match 2–1 against Schalke 04, giving them their 12th cup title.

Route to the final
The DFB-Pokal began with 64 teams in a single-elimination knockout cup competition. There were a total of five rounds leading up to the final. Teams were drawn against each other, and the winner after 90 minutes would advance. If still tied, 30 minutes of extra time was played. If the score was still level, a penalty shoot-out was used to determine the winner.

Note: In all results below, the score of the finalist is given first (H: home; A: away).

Match

Details

References

External links
 Match report at kicker.de 
 Match report at WorldFootball.net
 Match report at Fussballdaten.de 

FC Schalke 04 matches
FC Bayern Munich matches
2004–05 in German football cups
2005
May 2005 sports events in Europe
2005 in Berlin
Football competitions in Berlin